J. Leo Fairbanks House may refer to:

J. Leo Fairbanks House (Corvallis, Oregon), listed on the National Register of Historic Places in Benton County, Oregon
J. Leo Fairbanks House (Salt Lake City, Utah), listed on the National Register of Historic Places in Salt Lake City, Utah

See also
Fairbanks House (disambiguation)